Memoryhouse is the 2002 debut album by neo-classical composer Max Richter. Originally released under the Late Junction label, the album was reissued by FatCat Records in 2009 and 2014 with alternative album artwork.

Critical reception

Memoryhouse received largely positive reviews from contemporary music critics. Pitchfork Media gave the album a very positive review in a retrospective review for the 2014 reissue on FatCat.

Track listing

Personnel
Main personnel
 Max Richter – composer, mixing, primary artist, producer
 BBC Philharmonic Orchestra – orchestra
 Levine Andrade – viola
 Alexander Bălănescu – soloist, violin
 Kirsteen Davidson Kelly – piano
 Judith Herbert – cello, soloist
 Sarah Leonard – soloist, soprano
 Rumon Gamba – conductor

Additional personnel
 John Cage – readings, text
 Jane Carter – executive producer
 Neil Hutchinson – engineer, mixing
 Mandy Parnell – remastering
 Ania Piesiewicz – photography
 Sarah Sutcliffe – readings
 Marina Tsvetaeva – text

References

2002 debut albums
Max Richter albums